Farida Arouche (born 30 September 1980), is an Algerian Woman International Master (WIM, 2002) and African Women's Chess Championship winner (2003).

Biography
Farida Arouche participated in World Youth Chess Championships in various age groups. In 2001, in Cairo she won silver medal in African Women's Chess Championship. In 2003, in Abuja she won African Women's Chess Championship. In 2003, Farida Arouche played for Algeria in All-Africa Games chess tournament and won team gold medal.

In 2000s Farida Arouche participated in Women's World Chess Championship by knock-out system:
 In Women's World Chess Championship 2001 in the first round lost to Xu Yuhua,
 In Women's World Chess Championship 2004 in the first round lost to Maia Chiburdanidze.

Farida Arouche played for Algeria in the Women's Chess Olympiads:
 In 1994, at first board in the 31st Chess Olympiad (women) in Moscow (+4, =5, -3),
 In 2002, at third board in the 35th Chess Olympiad (women) in Bled (+3, =8, -2).

References

External links

Farida Arouche chess games at 365Chess.com

1980 births
Living people
Algerian female chess players
Chess Woman International Masters
Chess Olympiad competitors
African Games medalists in chess
Competitors at the 2003 All-Africa Games
African Games gold medalists for Algeria
21st-century Algerian women
20th-century Algerian women